Arjen Hagenauw (born 11 August 1994) is a Dutch professional footballer who plays as a striker for SC Genemuiden.

Club career 

Hagenauw joined FC Groningen in 2011 from VV Roden, the club from his birthplace. His Eredivisie debut came at 22 March 2014 in a 3–1 home win against SBV Vitesse. His second appearance came at 31 August 2014 in a 2–0 home win against defending champions AFC Ajax.

References

External links

1995 births
Living people
Dutch footballers
FC Groningen players
FC Emmen players
Eredivisie players
Eerste Divisie players
People from Noordenveld
Association football forwards
Asser Christelijke Voetbalvereniging players
SC Genemuiden players
Footballers from Drenthe